Hotson is an English surname. Notable people with the surname include:

 J Leslie Hotson (1897–1992), Shakespearean scholar
 John Ernest Buttery Hotson (1877–1944), Governor of Bombay